Henry Alfred "Jackie" Gibson (31 March 1914 – 15 January 1944) was a South African long-distance runner. He finished eighth in the marathon at the 1936 Summer Olympics. At the 1938 Empire Games he won the bronze medal in the marathon and placed sixth in the 6 miles contest.

Gibson served in the South African Air Force where he reached the rank of Lieutenant in the 25 Squadron. He died along with the rest of the crew in an aircraft accident when their Lockheed B-34 Ventura II #6026 flew into a hilltop near Eshowe, Natal during bad weather. He was buried in the  Stellawood Cemetery in Durban.

In commemoration of his success in athletics, the Jackie Gibson Memorial Marathon was inaugurated in 1946 and is the oldest marathon in Johannesburg.

References  

1914 births
1944 deaths
Sportspeople from Johannesburg
South African male marathon runners
South African male long-distance runners
Olympic athletes of South Africa
Athletes (track and field) at the 1936 Summer Olympics
Athletes (track and field) at the 1938 British Empire Games
Commonwealth Games bronze medallists for South Africa
Commonwealth Games medallists in athletics
Victims of aviation accidents or incidents in South Africa
South African Air Force personnel of World War II
South African military personnel killed in World War II
South African Air Force officers
Medallists at the 1938 British Empire Games